Last Assassins is the pay-cable, syndication and DVD release title of the 1997 action film Dusting Cliff 7 starring Nancy Allen and Lance Henriksen. The film, which was shot on location throughout Southern California, was released on DVD in 1998 and repackaged for release in 2010.

Plot
The young daughter of a tough, Valerie Plame-like CIA operative (Nancy Allen) is violently abducted and held for ransom in exchange for vital top secret information which outlines the whereabouts of buried nuclear arms at government restricted Cliff Seven in the Mojave desert.

Cast
Nancy Allen ...  Anna Bishop 
Lance Henriksen ...  Colonel Roger McBride 
Scott Lincoln ...  Brock Daniels 
Dean Scofield ...  Mitch Stevens 
Ashley Buccille ...  Carrie Bishop 
Floyd 'Red Crow' Westerman ...  Indian Bob Pireegie
Ron Byron ...  Norton 
Carol Crane ...  Anna's Mother 
Oliver Darrow ...  Oliver Darrow 
Mary Deese ...  Angel Martinez 
Kiran Gonsalves ...  Assassin #1 
Shashawnee Hall ...  Hayes 
Philip Lehl ...  Hallman 
Zahn McClarnon ...  Indian Louis 
Jim Menza ...  Russell 
Dutch Merrick ...  Storm Troop Leader (as Steve 'Dutch' Merrick) 
Christopher Landry ...  Capt. Belvedere (uncredited) 
Steve Pope ...  Concierge

References

External links

 

Films shot in California
1997 films
American action films
1997 action films
Films about nuclear war and weapons
1990s English-language films
1990s American films